Samdari Junction is a railway station in Barmer district, Rajasthan, India. Its code is SMR. It serves Samdari town. The station consists of 3 platforms. Passenger, Express and Superfast trains halt here.

References

Railway stations in Barmer district
Jodhpur railway division